Edward Richard Baker (21 January 1901 – 22 July 1986) was an Australian rules footballer who played with four clubs in the Victorian Football League (VFL), mainly for Geelong and Collingwood.

A rover, he also played eight games for Victoria at interstate football.

The highlight of his career was being Geelong's premiership captain in 1931.

See also
 1927 Melbourne Carnival

Footnotes

External links

1901 births
1986 deaths
Australian rules footballers from Victoria (Australia)
Geelong Football Club players
Geelong Football Club Premiership players
Collingwood Football Club players
Carlton Football Club players
Western Bulldogs players
One-time VFL/AFL Premiership players
People from Maryborough, Victoria